Alive & Rockin' is a live video of Foreigner 
that features nine of the group's 16 hits. It was recorded at the Bang Your Head!!! festival in Balingen, Germany, for the band's 30th anniversary in 2006.

Track listing 
"Intro"
"Double Vision"
"Head Games"
"Dirty White Boy"
"Cold As Ice"
"Starrider"
"Urgent"
"Feels Like the First Time"
"Juke Box Hero / Whole Lotta Love"
"Hot Blooded"

Personnel 

Mick Jones - Guitars
Kelly Hansen - Vocals
Jason Bonham - Drums
Jeff Jacobs - Keyboards
Thom Gimbel - Guitars, Saxophone, Flute
Jeff Pilson - Bass

Bonus features 
"Interviews with Jason Bonham, Mick Jones and Kelly Hansen"
"Foreigner TV - out and about with the fans when Foreigner play live"

Foreigner (band) albums
2007 video albums